The 35th Indiana Infantry Regiment, also known as 1st Irish Regiment as it was mainly made up of Irish-Americans, was a unit of the Union Army during the American Civil War.

Service 
Organized December 11, 1861
Battle of Stones River
Battle of Hoover's Gap
Battle of Chickamauga
First Battle of Chattanooga
Third Battle of Chattanooga
Ringgold Gap
Atlanta Campaign
Battle of Rocky Face Ridge
Battle of Resaca
Battle of New Hope Church
Battle of Dallas
Battle of Marietta
Battle of Kennesaw Mountain
Atlanta
Battle of Jonesborough
Franklin-Nashville Campaign
Battle of Columbia
Battle of Franklin
Battle of Nashville
Mustered out on October 23, 1865

Commanders 
 Colonel John C. Walker
 Colonel Bernard F. Mullen
 Colonel August Tassin
 Major John P. Dufficy

See also

 Irish Americans in the American Civil War
 List of Indiana Civil War regiments
 Indiana in the Civil War

References 
Dyer, F.H. 1908. A compendium of the war of the rebellion compiled and arranged from official records of the federal and Confederate armies... The Dyer Publishing Company. Des Moines, Iowa, USA.

35
Irish regiments of the United States Army
Military units and formations established in 1861
Military units and formations disestablished in 1865
1861 establishments in Indiana